Crespi Carmelite High School, shortly known as Crespi, is a private Catholic all-boys four-year college preparatory high school located in Encino District, Los Angeles, California. It is part of the Roman Catholic Archdiocese of Los Angeles.

The school was named for Friar Juan Crespí, and was founded in 1959 by the Carmelite religious order, and has been run by the Carmelites since that time.

Academics

Crespi Carmelite High School offers a college-preparatory education.  As of 2022–2023 the academic program has 19 Advanced Placement courses.

Athletics
Over the years Crespi has won twelve CIF Southern Section division team titles – Baseball (Division III in 2003; Division II in 2009), Basketball "Back to Back" State titles (CIF Division IV State Title 2015 and Division I State Title 2016) (Section Division IV-AA in 2001, 2010, and 2015), Football (Big Five in 1986; Division X in 2004 and 2005), Track & Field (Division 2-A in 1973; Division III in 2008), Water Polo (Division 2-A in 1981, Division 6 in 2019), and Swimming Division 3 in 2021).

Notable alumni

Athletes

Stephen Amritraj, ATP
Bryan Bennett, CFL
Randy Cross, NFL
William Curran, NFL
Rick Dempsey, MLB
Keith Eck, NFL
Christian Fauria, NFL
Joseph Fauria, NFL
Sione Fua, NFL
Sean Gilmartin, MLB
Hroniss Grasu, NFL
Chris Harper, CFL
Ryon Healy, MLB
Max Heidegger, the Israeli Premier League and the EuroLeague
Scott Heineman, MLB
Brian Horwitz, MLB
Babe Laufenberg, NFL
Devin Lucien, NFL
De’Anthony Melton, NBA
Paul Mokeski, NBA
London Perrantes (born 1994), NBA and Israeli Basketball Premier League
Trevor Plouffe, MLB
Jeff Suppan, MLB
Marvell Tell, NFL
Charles Washington, NFL
Harry Edward Welch, Jr., high school football coach
Russell White, NFL
Shaun Williams, NFL

Business/CEO
 
Michael Lang, former CEO of Miramax, currently CEO of Pixel United
Brodie Van Wagenen, general manager for the New York Mets, MLB (2018–2020)
Travis Robinson, CEO for Spicy Viking International Hot Sauce, 2020–present

Arts and entertainment

Michael Angarano, actor
Martin Donovan, actor
Matthew Nelson, singer-songwriter, musician and recording artist
Gunnar Nelson, singer-songwriter, musician and recording artist
Sergio Sylvestre, pop singer, 2015 winner of the popular Italian TV show Amici di Maria de Filippi

References

External links

Crespi Carmelite High School

Boys' schools in the United States
Roman Catholic secondary schools in Los Angeles County, California
Educational institutions established in 1959
High schools in the San Fernando Valley
Carmelite educational institutions
High schools in Los Angeles County, California
Encino, Los Angeles
Catholic secondary schools in California
1959 establishments in California